The basketball tournament at the 1979 Mediterranean Games was held in Split, Croatia, Yugoslavia.

Medalists

External links
1979 Competition Medalists

Basketball
Basketball at the Mediterranean Games
International basketball competitions hosted by Yugoslavia
International basketball competitions hosted by Croatia
1979–80 in European basketball
1979 in Asian basketball
1979 in African basketball
1979–80 in Yugoslav basketball